Wilbur Johns (December 8, 1903 – July 14, 1967) was an American men's college basketball coach and athletics administrator. He was the head basketball coach at the University of California, Los Angeles (UCLA), prior to John Wooden, serving from 1939 to 1948, and guiding the UCLA Bruins to a 93–120 record in nine seasons. Johns was also the school's athletic director following from 1947 to 1963. He is a 1985 inductee to the UCLA Athletics Hall of Fame. He died at his home at age 63 on July 14, 1967.

Johns played four years basketball at UCLA, graduating in 1925.

Head coaching record

References
General

Specific

1903 births
1967 deaths
American men's basketball coaches
American men's basketball players
Basketball coaches from California
Sportspeople from Glendale, California
Sportspeople from Los Angeles
UCLA Bruins athletic directors
UCLA Bruins men's basketball coaches
UCLA Bruins men's basketball players
UCLA Bruins men's swimmers
UCLA Bruins men's tennis players
Basketball players from Los Angeles
Tennis players from Los Angeles